The Minister of Aviation (Canada) was the minister in charge of the military air service in Canada prior to the creation of the RCAF. There was no official minister in charge of this department as Canada did not have a formal air force.

The department was likely responsible for the Canadian Aviation Corps (which was under the Canadian Expeditionary Force) during World War I from 1914 to 1915 and the early Canadian Air Force from 1918 to 1920.

In 1923 the National Defence Act merged the post of Minister of Militia and Defence with the Minister of the Naval Service. The re-emerged in World War II as the Minister of National Defence for Air (Canada).

List of Ministers
 George Halsey Perley 1916-1917
 Albert Edward Kemp - with his role as Minister of Overseas Military Forces  1917-1920

See also

 Minister of Militia and Defence
 Minister of the Naval Service
 Minister of National Defence
 Minister of National Defence for Naval Services
 Minister of National Defence for Air
 Minister of National Defence
 Minister of Overseas Military Forces
 Air Board (Canada)

Aviation
Canadian military aviation